The following lists events that happened during the year 1998 in Bosnia and Herzegovina.

Incumbents
Presidency:
Alija Izetbegović 
Krešimir Zubak (until November 15), Ante Jelavić (starting November 15)
Momčilo Krajišnik (until October 13), Živko Radišić (starting October 13)
Prime Minister: Haris Silajdžić

Events

September
 September 12 and 13 - 1998 Bosnian general election took place.

 
Years of the 20th century in Bosnia and Herzegovina
1990s in Bosnia and Herzegovina
Bosnia and Herzegovina
Bosnia and Herzegovina